The main purpose of theories of second-language acquisition (SLA) is to shed light on how people who already know one language learn a second language. The field of second-language acquisition involves various contributions, such as linguistics, sociolinguistics, psychology, cognitive science, neuroscience, and education. 
These multiple fields in second-language acquisition can be grouped as four major research strands: (a) linguistic dimensions of SLA, (b) cognitive (but not linguistic) dimensions of SLA, (c) socio-cultural dimensions of SLA, and (d) instructional dimensions of SLA. While the orientation of each research strand is distinct, they are in common in that they can guide us to find helpful condition to facilitate successful language learning. Acknowledging the contributions of each perspective and the interdisciplinarity between each field, more and more second language researchers are now trying to have a bigger lens on examining the complexities of second language acquisition.

History

As second-language acquisition began as an interdisciplinary field, it is hard to pin down a precise starting date. However, there are two publications in particular that are seen as instrumental to the development of the modern study of SLA: (1) Corder's 1967 essay The Significance of Learners' Errors, and (2) Selinker's 1972 article Interlanguage. Corder's essay rejected a behaviorist account of SLA and suggested that learners made use of intrinsic internal linguistic processes; Selinker's article argued that second-language learners possess their own individual linguistic systems that are independent from both the first and second languages.

In the 1970s the general trend in SLA was for research exploring the ideas of Corder and Selinker, and refuting behaviorist theories of language acquisition. Examples include research into error analysis, studies in transitional stages of second-language ability, and the "morpheme studies" investigating the order in which learners acquired linguistic features. The 70s were dominated by naturalistic studies of people learning English as a second language.

By the 1980s, the theories of Stephen Krashen had become the prominent paradigm in SLA. In his theories, often collectively known as the Input Hypothesis, Krashen suggested that language acquisition is driven solely by comprehensible input, language input that learners can understand. Krashen's model was influential in the field of SLA and also had a large influence on language teaching, but it left some important processes in SLA unexplained. Research in the 1980s was characterized by the attempt to fill in these gaps. Some approaches included White's descriptions of learner competence, and Pienemann's use of speech processing models and lexical functional grammar to explain learner output. This period also saw the beginning of approaches based in other disciplines, such as the psychological approach of connectionism.

The 1990s saw a host of new theories introduced to the field, such as Michael Long's interaction hypothesis, Merrill Swain's output hypothesis, and Richard Schmidt's noticing hypothesis. However, the two main areas of research interest were linguistic theories of SLA based upon Noam Chomsky's universal grammar, and psychological approaches such as skill acquisition theory and connectionism. The latter category also saw the new theories of processability and input processing in this time period. The 1990s also saw the introduction of sociocultural theory, an approach to explain second-language acquisition in terms of the social environment of the learner.

In the 2000s research was focused on much the same areas as in the 1990s, with research split into two main camps of linguistic and psychological approaches. VanPatten and Benati do not see this state of affairs as changing in the near future, pointing to the support both areas of research have in the wider fields of linguistics and psychology, respectively.

Universal grammar 

From the field of linguistics, the most influential theory by far has been Chomsky's theory of Universal Grammar (UG). The core of this theory lies on the existence of an innate universal grammar, grounded on the poverty of the stimulus. The UG model of principles, basic properties which all languages share, and parameters, properties which can vary between languages, has been the basis for much second-language research.

From a UG perspective, learning the grammar of a second language is simply a matter of setting the correct parameters. Take the pro-drop parameter, which dictates whether or not sentences must have a subject in order to be grammatically correct. This parameter can have two values: positive, in which case sentences do not necessarily need a subject, and negative, in which case subjects must be present. In German the sentence "Er spricht" (he speaks) is grammatical, but the sentence "Spricht" (speaks) is ungrammatical. In Italian, however, the sentence "Parla" (speaks) is perfectly normal and grammatically correct. A German speaker learning Italian would only need to deduce that subjects are optional from the language he hears, and then set his pro-drop parameter for Italian accordingly. Once he has set all the parameters in the language correctly, then from a UG perspective he can be said to have learned Italian, i.e. he will always produce perfectly correct Italian sentences.

Universal Grammar also provides a succinct explanation for much of the phenomenon of language transfer. Spanish learners of English who make the mistake "Is raining" instead of "It is raining" have not yet set their pro-drop parameters correctly and are still using the same setting as in Spanish.

The main shortcoming of Universal Grammar in describing second-language acquisition is that it does not deal at all with the psychological processes involved with learning a language. UG scholarship is only concerned with whether parameters are set or not, not with how they are set. Schachter (1988) is a useful critique of research testing the role of Universal Grammar in second language acquisition.

Input hypothesis 

Learners' most direct source of information about the target language is the target language itself. When they come into direct contact with the target language, this is referred to as "input." When learners process that language in a way that can contribute to learning, this is referred to as "intake".  However, it must be at a level that is comprehensible to them. In his monitor theory, Krashen advanced the concept that language input should be at the "i+1" level, just beyond what the learner can fully understand; this input is comprehensible, but contains structures that are not yet fully understood. This has been criticized on the basis that there is no clear definition of i+1, and that factors other than structural difficulty (such as interest or presentation) can affect whether input is actually turned into intake. The concept has been quantified, however, in vocabulary acquisition research; Nation reviews various studies which indicate that about 98% of the words in running text should be previously known in order for extensive reading to be effective.

In his Input Hypothesis, Krashen proposes that language acquisition takes place only when learners receive input just beyond their current level of L2 competence. He termed this level of input “i+1.” However, in contrast to emergentist and connectionist theories, he follows the innate approach by applying Chomsky's Government and binding theory and concept of Universal grammar (UG) to second-language acquisition. He does so by proposing a Language Acquisition Device that uses L2 input to define the parameters of the L2, within the constraints of UG, and to increase the L2 proficiency of the learner. In addition, Krashen (1982)’s Affective Filter Hypothesis holds that the acquisition of a second language is halted if the learner has a high degree of anxiety when receiving input. According to this concept, a part of the mind filters out L2 input and prevents intake by the learner, if the learner feels that the process of SLA is threatening. As mentioned earlier, since input is essential in Krashen’s model, this filtering action prevents acquisition from progressing.

A great deal of research has taken place on input enhancement, the ways in which input may be altered so as to direct learners' attention to linguistically important areas. Input enhancement might include bold-faced vocabulary words or marginal glosses in a reading text. Research here is closely linked to research on pedagogical effects, and comparably diverse.

Monitor model 

Other concepts have also been influential in the speculation about the processes of building internal systems of second-language information. Some thinkers hold that language processing handles distinct types of knowledge. For instance, one component of the Monitor Model, propounded by Krashen, posits a distinction between “acquisition” and “learning.” According to Krashen, L2 acquisition is a subconscious process of incidentally “picking up” a language, as children do when becoming proficient in their first languages. Language learning, on the other hand, is studying, consciously and intentionally, the features of a language, as is common in traditional classrooms. Krashen sees these two processes as fundamentally different, with little or no interface between them. In common with connectionism, Krashen sees input as essential to language acquisition.

Further, Bialystok and Smith make another distinction in explaining how learners build and use L2 and interlanguage knowledge structures. They argue that the concept of interlanguage should include a distinction between two specific kinds of language processing ability. On one hand is learners’ knowledge of L2 grammatical structure and ability to analyze the target language objectively using that knowledge, which they term “representation,” and, on the other hand is the ability to use their L2 linguistic knowledge, under time constraints, to accurately comprehend input and produce output in the L2, which they call “control.” They point out that often non-native speakers of a language have higher levels of representation than their native-speaking counterparts have, yet have a lower level of control. Finally, Bialystok has framed the acquisition of language in terms of the interaction between what she calls “analysis” and “control.” Analysis is what learners do when they attempt to understand the rules of the target language. Through this process, they acquire these rules and can use them to gain greater control over their own production.

Monitoring is another important concept in some theoretical models of learner use of L2 knowledge. According to Krashen, the Monitor is a component of an L2 learner's language processing device that uses knowledge gained from language learning to observe and regulate the learner's own L2 production, checking for accuracy and adjusting language production when necessary.

Interaction hypothesis 

Long's interaction hypothesis proposes that language acquisition is strongly facilitated by the use of the target language in interaction. Similarly to Krashen's Input Hypothesis, the Interaction Hypothesis claims that comprehensible input is important for language learning. In addition, it claims that the effectiveness of comprehensible input is greatly increased when learners have to negotiate for meaning.

Interactions often result in learners receiving negative evidence.  That is, if learners say something that their interlocutors do not understand, after negotiation the interlocutors may model the correct language form. In doing this, learners can receive feedback on their production and on grammar that they have not yet mastered. The process of interaction may also result in learners receiving more input from their interlocutors than they would otherwise. Furthermore, if learners stop to clarify things that they do not understand, they may have more time to process the input they receive. This can lead to better understanding and possibly the acquisition of new language forms.  Finally, interactions may serve as a way of focusing learners' attention on a difference between their knowledge of the target language and the reality of what they are hearing; it may also focus their attention on a part of the target language of which they are not yet aware.

Output hypothesis 

In the 1980s, Canadian SLA researcher Merrill Swain advanced the output hypothesis, that meaningful output is as necessary to language learning as meaningful input. However, most studies have shown little if any correlation between learning and quantity of output. Today, most scholars  contend that small amounts of meaningful output are important to language learning, but primarily because the experience of producing language leads to more effective processing of input.

Critical Period Hypothesis 
In 1967, Eric Lenneberg argued the existence of a critical period (approximately 2–13 years old) for the acquisition of a first language. This has attracted much attention in the realm of second language acquisition. For instance, Newport (1990) extended the argument of critical period hypothesis by pointing to a possibility that when a learner is exposed to an L2 might also contribute to their second language acquisition. Indeed, she revealed the correlation between age of arrival and second language performance. In this regard, second language learning might be affected by a learner's maturational state .

Competition model 

Some of the major cognitive theories of how learners organize language knowledge are based on analyses of how speakers of various languages analyze sentences for meaning. MacWhinney, Bates, and Kliegl found that speakers of English, German, and Italian showed varying patterns in identifying the subjects of transitive sentences containing more than one noun. English speakers relied heavily on word order; German speakers used morphological agreement, the animacy status of noun referents, and stress; and speakers of Italian relied on agreement and stress. MacWhinney et al. interpreted these results as supporting the Competition Model, which states that individuals use linguistic cues to get meaning from language, rather than relying on linguistic universals. According to this theory, when acquiring an L2, learners sometimes receive competing cues and must decide which cue(s) is most relevant for determining meaning.

Connectionism and second-language acquisition 

 These findings also relate to Connectionism. Connectionism attempts to model the cognitive language processing of the human brain, using computer architectures that make associations between elements of language, based on frequency of co-occurrence in the language input. Frequency has been found to be a factor in various linguistic domains of language learning. Connectionism posits that learners form mental connections between items that co-occur, using exemplars found in language input. From this input, learners extract the rules of the language through cognitive processes common to other areas of cognitive skill acquisition. Since connectionism denies both innate rules and the existence of any innate language-learning module, L2 input is of greater importance than it is in processing models based on innate approaches, since, in connectionism, input is the source of both the units and the rules of language.

Noticing hypothesis 

Attention is another characteristic that some believe to have a role in determining the success or failure of language processing. Richard Schmidt states that although explicit metalinguistic knowledge of a language is not always essential for acquisition, the learner must be aware of L2 input in order to gain from it. In his “noticing hypothesis,” Schmidt posits that learners must notice the ways in which their interlanguage structures differ from target norms. This noticing of the gap allows the learner's internal language processing to restructure the learner's internal representation of the rules of the L2 in order to bring the learner's production closer to the target. In this respect, Schmidt's understanding is consistent with the ongoing process of rule formation found in emergentism and connectionism.

Processability 

Some theorists and researchers have contributed to the cognitive approach to second-language acquisition by increasing understanding of the ways L2 learners restructure their interlanguage knowledge systems to be in greater conformity to L2 structures. Processability theory states that learners restructure their L2 knowledge systems in an order of which they are capable at their stage of development. For instance, In order to acquire the correct morphological and syntactic forms for English questions, learners must transform declarative English sentences. They do so by a series of stages, consistent across learners. Clahsen proposed that certain processing principles determine this order of restructuring. Specifically, he stated that learners first, maintain declarative word order while changing other aspects of the utterances, second, move words to the beginning and end of sentences, and third, move elements within main clauses before subordinate clauses.

Automaticity 
Thinkers have produced several theories concerning how learners use their internal L2 knowledge structures to comprehend L2 input and produce L2 output. One idea is that learners acquire proficiency in an L2 in the same way that people acquire other complex cognitive skills. Automaticity is the performance of a skill without conscious control. It results from the gradated process of proceduralization. In the field of cognitive psychology, Anderson expounds a model of skill acquisition, according to which persons use procedures to apply their declarative knowledge about a subject in order to solve problems. On repeated practice, these procedures develop into production rules that the individual can use to solve the problem, without accessing long-term declarative memory. Performance speed and accuracy improve as the learner implements these production rules. DeKeyser tested the application of this model to L2 language automaticity. He found that subjects developed increasing proficiency in performing tasks related to the morphosyntax of an artificial language, Autopractan, and performed on a learning curve typical of the acquisition of non-language cognitive skills. This evidence conforms to Anderson's general model of cognitive skill acquisition, supports the idea that declarative knowledge can be transformed into procedural knowledge, and tends to undermine the idea of Krashen that knowledge gained through language “learning” cannot be used to initiate speech production.

Declarative/procedural model 
 Michael T. Ullman has used a declarative/procedural model to understand how language information is stored. This model is consistent with a distinction made in general cognitive science between the storage and retrieval of facts, on the one hand, and understanding of how to carry out operations, on the other. It states that declarative knowledge consists of arbitrary linguistic information, such as irregular verb forms, that are stored in the brain's declarative memory. In contrast, knowledge about the rules of a language, such as grammatical word order is procedural knowledge and is stored in procedural memory. Ullman reviews several psycholinguistic and neurolinguistic studies that support the declarative/procedural model.

Memory and second-language acquisition 
Perhaps certain psychological characteristics constrain language processing. One area of research is the role of memory. Williams conducted a study in which he found some positive correlation between verbatim memory functioning and grammar learning success for his subjects. This suggests that individuals with less short-term memory capacity might have a limitation in performing cognitive processes for organization and use of linguistic knowledge.

Semantic theory 
For the second-language learner, the acquisition of meaning is arguably the most important task. Meaning is at the heart of a language, not the exotic sounds or elegant sentence structure. There are several types of meanings: lexical, grammatical, semantic, and pragmatic. All the different meanings contribute to the acquisition of meaning resulting in the integrated second language possession.

Lexical meaning – meaning that is stored in our mental lexicon;

Grammatical meaning – comes into consideration when calculating the meaning of a sentence; usually encoded in inflectional morphology (ex.  - ed for past simple, -‘s for third person possessive)

Semantic meaning – word meaning;

Pragmatic meaning – meaning that depends on context, requires knowledge of the world to decipher; for example, when someone asks on the phone, “Is Mike there?” he doesn’t want to know if Mike is physically there; he wants to know if he can talk to Mike.

Sociocultural theory 
Sociocultural theory was originally coined by Wertsch in 1985 and derived from the work of Lev Vygotsky and the Vygotsky Circle in Moscow from the 1920s onwards. Sociocultural theory is the notion that human mental function is from participating cultural mediation integrated into social activities. The central thread of sociocultural theory focuses on diverse social, historical, cultural, and political contexts where language learning occurs and how learners negotiate or resist the diverse options that surround them. More recently, in accordance with this sociocultural thread, Larsen-Freeman (2011) created the triangle form that shows the interplay of four Important concepts in language learning and education: (a) teacher, (b) learner, (c) language or culture and (d) context. In this regard, what makes sociocultural theory different from other theories is that it argues that second learning acquisition is not a universal process. On the contrary, it views learners as active participants by interacting with others and also the culture of the environment.

Complex Dynamic Systems Theory 

Second language acquisition has been usually investigated by applying traditional cross-sectional studies. In these designs usually a pre-test post-test method is used. However, in the 2000s a novel angle emerged in the field of second language research. These studies mainly adopt Dynamic systems theory perspective to analyse longitudinal time-series data. Scientists such as Larsen-Freeman, Verspoor, de Bot, Lowie, van Geert claim that second language acquisition can be best captured by applying longitudinal case study research design rather than cross-sectional designs. In these studies variability is seen a key indicator of development, self-organization from a Dynamic systems parlance. The interconnectedness of the systems is usually analysed by moving correlations.

Notes

References 

Second-language acquisition